Szymański (feminine: Szymańska, plural Szymańscy) is the ninth most common surname in Poland with about 114 075 people (0.3% of Polish population) sharing it by 2015.

Notable people
 Adam Szymański (1852–1916), Polish writer
 Antoni Szymański (1894–1973), Polish Army general
 Beata Szymańska (born 1938), Polish poet and writer
 Bolesław Szymański (born 1950), Polish-American computer scientist
 Damian Szymański (born 1995), Polish footballer
 Dick Szymanski (1932–2021), American football player
 Frank Szymanski (1923–1987), American football player
 Grzegorz Szymański (born 1978), Polish volleyball player
 Halina Szymańska (1906–1989), Polish spy
 Henry Szymanski (1898–1959), American wrestler
 Ignacy Szymański (1806–1874), Polish soldier
 Iwonka Bogumila Szymanska (born 1943), Polish composer
 Jake Toranzo Szymanski (born 1994), American actor
 Jakub Szymanski (born 1983), Czech handball player
 Jakub Szymański (born 1998), Polish volleyball player
 Jan Szymański (born 1989), Polish speed skater
 Jan Szymański (1960–2005), Polish wrestler
 Józef Szymański (1926–2016), Polish bobsledder
 Karol Szymański (born 1993), Polish footballer
 Konrad Szymański (born 1969), Polish politician
 Krystyna Szymańska-Lara (born 1969), Polish basketball player
 Maciej Szymański (born 1957), Polish diplomat
 Marcin Szymański (born 1972), Polish footballer
 Marija Šimanska (1922–1995), Latvian chemist
 Paweł Szymański (born 1954), Polish composer
 Roman Szymański (1840–1908), Polish political activist
 Sebastian Szymański (born 1999), Polish footballer
 Stanisław Szymański (1862 – 1944), Polish industrialist
 Stanisław Szymański (1930 - 1999), Polish ballet dancer
 Timothy Szymanski, American navy admiral

See also

References

Polish-language surnames
Patronymic surnames
Surnames from given names